Nikko Landeros (born April 28, 1989) is an ice sled hockey player and paralympic freestyle skier from the United States.

He took part in the 2010 Winter Paralympics in Vancouver, where USA won gold. They beat Japan 2–0 in the final. He was also on the team USA in the 2014 Winter Paralympics in Sochi, which won gold by beating Russia 1–0 in the final.

He and his best friend Tyler Carron had an accident when they were 17. Both lost their legs. His father is a native of Mexico and his mother is from Milan, Italy.

References

External links
 
 
 
 
 
 

1989 births
Living people
American male freestyle skiers
American sledge hockey players
Paralympic sledge hockey players of the United States
Paralympic gold medalists for the United States
Ice sledge hockey players at the 2010 Winter Paralympics
Ice sledge hockey players at the 2014 Winter Paralympics
Medalists at the 2010 Winter Paralympics
Medalists at the 2014 Winter Paralympics
X Games athletes
American sportspeople of Mexican descent
American people of Italian descent
Medalists at the 2018 Winter Paralympics
Paralympic medalists in sledge hockey
People from Berthoud, Colorado